Terrapin Hill is a rounded, reddish-colored hill, 545 m high, standing at the south end of The Naze, a peninsula of northern James Ross Island, close south of Trinity Peninsula. This area was first explored by the Swedish Antarctic Expedition, 1901–04, under Nordenskjold. Terrapin Hill was first charted by the Falkland Islands Dependencies Survey (FIDS), 1945, who in 1948 applied this name which is descriptive of its shape.

Hills of Graham Land
Landforms of James Ross Island